During the 2006–07 English football season, Oldham Athletic A.F.C. competed in Football League One.

Season summary
Oldham finished the season in sixth, qualifying for the playoffs, but were beaten 5–2 on aggregate by Blackpool in the semi-finals.

First-team squad
Squad at end of season

Left club during season

Transfers

In
 Alan Blayney - unattached (last at Doncaster Rovers), 16 February
 Les Pogliacomi - Blackpool
 Neil Wood - Blackpool
 Simon Charlton - Norwich City
 Craig Rocastle - Sheffield Wednesday

Out

Loan in
 Miki Roqué - Liverpool
 Luigi Glombard - Cardiff City

Loan out

Results

League One

FA Cup

League Cup

Football League Trophy

Statistics

Appearances and goals

Top scorers

References

2006
Ol